Filip Ozobić (born 8 April 1991) is a professional footballer who plays as a midfielder for Azerbaijan Premier League club Qarabağ. Born in Croatia, Ozobić represented the Croatia national team in two friendly matches before switching to represent the Azerbaijan national team.

Club career

Early career
In January 2008, Spartak Moscow acquired Filip while he was still playing for Dinamo Zagreb's under-19 side. Spartak then immediately loaned him out to Croatian First Division side Zadar, where he spent the remainder of the 2007–08 and the 2008–09 seasons. He then returned to Spartak for the 2010–11 season and made his professional debut in the Russian Premier League on 28 November 2010 for Spartak Moscow. He made one further appearance that season and in the following first half of the next season. Croatian club HNK Hajduk Split then took Ozobić on a loan for the next 18 months where he largely failed to impress and spent most of the time as either a reserve or a substitute. He was released from his Spartak contract in summer 2013. NK Slaven Belupo, amid other sides, were interested in the player who was then a free agent and moved fastest, confirming his signing on 6 September 2013.

Gabala
On 11 June 2016, Ozobić signed a two-year contract with Azerbaijan Premier League side Gabala FK.

Qarabağ
Ozobić signed a three-year contract with Qarabağ FK on 2 June 2018 after his Gabala contract had expired.

International career

Croatia
From 2006, until 2011, Ozobić has been part of Croatia at youth international level, respectively has been part of the U16, U17, U18, U19, U20 and U21 teams and he with these teams played 58 matches and scored eight goals. In December 2016, he was named as part of the Croatia squad for 2017 China Cup. On 11 January 2017, Ozobić made his debut with Croatia in 2017 China Cup semi-final against Chile after being named in the starting line-up.

Azerbaijan 

On 14 July 2021, the Association of Football Federations of Azerbaijan announced that FIFA accepted Ozobić's request to play for Azerbaijan after staying in the country for almost five years. On 27 August 2021, he was called up to join Azerbaijan national football team.

Career statistics

Club

International

International goals

Honours

Club
Hajduk Split
Croatian Cup: 2012–13
Qarabağ
Azerbaijan Premier League: 2018–19, 2019–20

Individual
Azerbaijan Premier League Top Scorer (1): 2016–17

References

External links

Profile on Russian Professional Football League website
Filip Ozobić profile at hajduk.hr

1991 births
Living people
Sportspeople from Bjelovar
Dual internationalists (football)
Azerbaijani footballers
Azerbaijan international footballers
Croatian footballers
Croatia international footballers
Croatia under-21 international footballers
Croatia youth international footballers
Azerbaijani people of Croatian descent
Croatian emigrants to Azerbaijan
Naturalized citizens of Azerbaijan
Azerbaijani expatriate footballers
Azerbaijani expatriate sportspeople in Russia
Croatian expatriate footballers
Croatian expatriate sportspeople in Russia
Croatian expatriate sportspeople in Azerbaijan
Association football midfielders
GNK Dinamo Zagreb players
Russian Premier League players
FC Spartak Moscow players
Croatian Football League players
HNK Hajduk Split players
NK Slaven Belupo players
Azerbaijan Premier League players
Gabala FC players
Qarabağ FK players